This is a list of Chinese national-type primary schools (SJK(C)) in Sabah, Malaysia. As of June 2022, there are 83 Chinese primary schools with a total of 35,338 students.

Statistics

Interior Division

Keningau District

Tambunan District

Tenom District

Beaufort District

Sipitang District

Kuala Penyu District

Sandakan Division

Sandakan District

Beluran District

Tawau Division

Tawau District

Lahad Datu District

Kunak District

Semporna District

West Coast Division

Kota Kinabalu District

Putatan District

Penampang District

Papar District

Tuaran District

Kota Belud District

Ranau District

Kudat Division

Kudat District

Kota Marudu District

See also 

 Lists of Chinese national-type primary schools in Malaysia

References

Schools in Sabah
Sabah
Chinese-language schools in Malaysia